Alfonso Delgado Evers (born 21 June 1942) is an Argentinian prelate of the Catholic Church. He was the Archbishop of San Juan de Cuyo from 2000 to 2017.

Early life and education
Evers was born in Rosario, Argentina. He attended the National University of Rosario and graduated as a surveyor. He earned a doctorate in dogmatic theology from the University of Navarra in Spain.

Church career
Evers was ordained as a priest to the Prelature of Opus Dei on 23 June 1970 in Spain by Luigi Dadaglio, the Apostolic Nuncio to Spain. He was appointed as Bishop of Santo Tomé on 20 March 1986 by Pope John Paul II and was consecrated a bishop on 25 April 1986 by Cardinal Juan Carlos Aramburu in Buenos Aires. 

He was transferred to Posadas on February 25, 1994. He was installed there on May 1, 1994. 

On 29 March 2000, he was made Archbishop of San Juan de Cuyo. He was installed there on May 24, 2000.

Pope Francis accepted his resignation on 17 June 2017.

References

 

21st-century Roman Catholic archbishops in Argentina
People from Rosario, Santa Fe
1942 births
Living people
National University of Rosario alumni
University of Navarra alumni
Roman Catholic bishops of Posadas
Roman Catholic bishops of Santo Tomé
Roman Catholic archbishops of San Juan de Cuyo